Rumen is a Bulgarian masculine given name, and may refer to:

 Rumen Radev (born 18 June 1963), president of Bulgaria
 Rumen Goranov (born 1984), Bulgarian footballer
 Rumen Petkov (born 1948), Bulgarian animator and comic creator
 Rumen Rangelov (born 1985), Bulgarian footballer
 Rumen Tinkov (born 1987), Bulgarian footballer

Slavic masculine given names
Rumen